Meeting People Is Terrible is the second album by Vancouver dance-punk band Fake Shark - Real Zombie!. Originally, it was set to be released April 25, 2009 in Canada but had been pushed back by the label to August 26, 2009 in Japan and international release May 31, 2010. The album contains the singles "Angel Lust" and "Siamese Disease". The album was preceded by the release of the Angel Lust EP, which contained songs included on the album. The album's title might be in reference to the Radiohead documentary Meeting People Is Easy.

The bonus track 'Puke Rawk' was produced, engineered and mixed by Hot Hot Heat singer Steve Bays.

Track listing

Line-up 
 Kevvy Mental - Vocals/Synths/Programming
 Louis Wu - Guitar/Vocals
 Parker Bossley - Bass/Vocals
 Malcolm Holt - Drums

References
Alex Turvey's blog featuring CD cover
Rock Pulse Interview Retrieved December 15. 2008

2009 albums
Fake Shark albums